Paul Ssemogerere may refer to:

 Paul Ssemogerere (politician) (1932-2022), lawyer and politician in Uganda
 Paul Ssemogerere (bishop) (born 1956), Roman Catholic priest and bishop of the Roman Catholic Diocese of Kasana-Luweero